This is a list of mayors of Pensacola, Florida. The mayor is the chief executive of the Pensacola city government. This list is from 1820 through present day, and includes Spanish, Confederate and United States mayors. 

In 1878, Salvador T. Pons, the first African–American mayor of Pensacola, was elected. 

In 1885, the city's charter was revoked by governor Edward A. Perry, replacing it with a state-appointed government. In 1895, a new city charter was passed by the Florida Legislature, replacing Perry's Provisional Municipality of Pensacola with a new charter, which stated that Pensacolians could elect their own mayor and aldermen.  

In 1931, the city government was changed to a council–manager government, which it had until 2009, when voters approved a new mayor–council charter.

List

See also
Mayor of Pensacola
History of Pensacola, Florida
 Timeline of Pensacola, Florida

References

External links
 Mayors of Pensacola

Pensacola